The Volleyball tournament of the 2009 Lusophone Games was played in Lisbon, Portugal. The venue was the Complexo Desportivo Municipal do Casal Vistoso. The tournament was played from 10  to 12 July 2009, and there are both men's and women's competition.

Volleyball medal table by country

Male Competition

Semi-finals

Volleyball medal table male competition

Portugal:
Phelipe Martins
Nuno Pereira
Marcel Gil
Ivo Casas
Carlos Coelho
Ricardo Silva
Hugo Faria
Alexandre Ferreira
Nuno Silva
Miguel Rebelo

Hugo Oliveira
Pedro Figueiredo

Female Competition

Round robin

Volleyball medal table female competition

See also
 ACOLOP
 Lusophone Games
 2009 Lusophone Games

V
Volleyball at the Lusofonia Games
2009 in volleyball